Owensdale is a small town in southwestern Pennsylvania. It is located in the northern part of Fayette County, just north of Connellsville. Owensdale sits in the middle of rich coal fields, which played a huge part in the town's past. It is now home to the interchange between the Wheeling and Lake Erie Railway and the Southwest Pennsylvania Railroad.

Unincorporated communities in Pennsylvania
Unincorporated communities in Fayette County, Pennsylvania